Scott Flanigan (born 22 December 1992) in Dublin is an Irish sailor. He competed at the 2012 Summer Olympics in the 470 class.

References

External links
RTE Profile

1992 births
Living people
Irish male sailors (sport)
Olympic sailors of Ireland
Sailors at the 2012 Summer Olympics – 470
Sportspeople from Dublin (city)
People educated at Belvedere College